Andreas Boyde (born 13 November 1967) is a German pianist.

Biography 
Boyde was born in Oschatz, Bezirk Leipzig.

He has appeared in recital as well as soloist with orchestras such as the London Philharmonic Orchestra, the Sächsische Staatskapelle Dresden, the Malaysian Philharmonic Orchestra, the Prague Radio Symphony Orchestra, the Dresden Philharmonic Orchestra, the Zurich Chamber Orchestra, the Bamberger Symphoniker, the Hallé Orchestra Manchester, the Bolshoi Symphony Orchestra, the Dresdner Sinfoniker, the London Mozart Players, the Norrköping Symphony Orchestra, the Miami Symphony Orchestra, the Slovenian Philharmonic Orchestra, the Auckland Philharmonia Orchestra, the Zagreb Philharmonic Orchestra, the Belgrade Philharmonic Orchestra and the Berliner Sinfonie Orchester.

The Brandenburgisches Staatsorchester Frankfurt (Oder) appointed Andreas Boyde Artist in Residence for the season 2018/19.

The pianist completed a Brahms cycle on CD for OehmsClassics in co-production with Westdeutscher Rundfunk (German radio).

Boyde has participated in several international music festivals including the Beethovenfest Bonn, Prague Autumn and La Roque d’Anthéron Piano Festival. He enjoys a close association with German radio established by frequent broadcast recordings and productions.

The pianist gave the European première of Paul Schoenfield’s Piano Concerto Four Parables, as well as the first performance of John Pickard’s Piano Concerto, which is dedicated to him. Boyde’s reconstruction of the ‘Schubert’ Variations by Robert Schumann, now published by Hofmeister Leipzig, reveals his interest in musicological issues and was premièred in New York City.

Boyde studied with Christa Holzweißig and Amadeus Webersinke in Dresden and subsequently with James Gibb at the Guildhall School of Music and Drama in London. His mentor and promoter Malcolm Frager also proved a major influence.

In addition to his many recordings for European radio and television, Boyde’s discography includes works by Brahms, Schumann, Tchaikovsky, Dvořák, Mussorgsky, Ravel, Scriabin and Schoenfield.

Boyde entered the Book of Honour of his hometown Oschatz in 2012.

Discography

OehmsClassics:
Johannes Brahms: The Complete Works for Solo Piano, Vol. 1 CD OC 584
Johannes Brahms: The Complete Works for Solo Piano, Vol. 2 CD OC 585
Johannes Brahms: The Complete Works for Solo Piano, Vol. 3 CD OC 586
Johannes Brahms: The Complete Works for Solo Piano, Vol. 4 CD OC 743
Johannes Brahms: The Complete Works for Solo Piano, Vol. 5 CD OC 744
Athene-Minerva Records:
Robert Schumann: Schumann Recital Düsseldorf CD ATHCD8
Peter I. Tchaikovsky: Piano Concerto No. 2 in G, Op. 44 CD ATHCD16
Modest Mussorgsky, Maurice Ravel: Pictures & Reflections CD ATHCD17
Antonín Dvořák, Paul Schoenfield: Piano Concertos CD ATHCD21
Robert Schumann, Johannes Brahms: Variations CD ATHCD23
Dreyer Gaido:
Alexander Scriabin: Prométhée, Op. 60 CD 21035

References

External links 
 Official site
 Official YouTube

1967 births
Living people
People from Oschatz
People from Bezirk Leipzig
German classical pianists
Male classical pianists
Alumni of the Guildhall School of Music and Drama
21st-century classical pianists
Oehms Classics artists
21st-century male musicians